Cadeyrn Neville (born 9 November 1988) is a rugby union footballer. His regular playing position is lock. He represents the ACT Brumbies in Super Rugby.

Early career 
Neville began attending Manly Selective Campus in 2001.

Neville joined the Australian Institute of Sport rowing program and left school in 2006. As a rower he represented Australia at the Youth Olympics, and trained with Australian rower Tom Swann, as both began their long-term preparations for the 2012 Olympics. Neville said, "The program I was in at the AIS when I left school in 2006, the goal of that was to produce a single sculler for London."

In 2008, Neville played junior rugby league for the Narraweena Hawks, in the Manly Warringah A Grade competition.

It wasn't until 2009 that he took up rugby union and completed his first season for the Manly club in Sydney. He made Manly first grade in 2010.

In 2011, Neville was named as a reserve for Sydney to play NSW Country, at Coogee Oval.

Playing at lock for Manly in the Shute Shield he went on to become one of the "competition's biggest improvers in 2011." Neville's Manly team mates, in 2011, included props Eddie Aholelei and Jono Owen, who both became his team mates the Melbourne Rebels in 2012.

Super Rugby

Rebels
Neville made his Melbourne Rebels debut during the 2012 Super Rugby season against the Bulls at AAMI Park, Melbourne. Neville started the game before being replaced by Al Campbell in the 45th minute in a 35–41 loss for the home side.

David Lord wrote, "Not only did Neville more than hold his own against a powerhouse pack led by Springbok Pierre Spies, but the Rebels went within a whisker of causing the biggest boilover of the season before going down 41–35 to a far more experienced lineup, giving the ... crowd plenty to cheer about when nobody expected the two-wins this season Rebels to match it with the two-loss Bulls."

Two weeks later, against the Force in Perth, Neville scored two tries to help the Rebels achieve their fourth win of the season.

Reds
Neville signed a two-year deal to join the  starting in the 2016 season.

Wallabies 
In May 2012 Neville was selected in the Wallabies training squad.

In 2022 Neville made his run-on debut for the Wallabies against England at Optus Stadium.

Super Rugby statistics

References

External links 

Living people
1988 births
Australian rugby union players
Rugby union locks
Melbourne Rebels players
Melbourne Rising players
Rugby union players from Sydney
Brisbane City (rugby union) players
Queensland Reds players
Australian expatriate rugby union players
Expatriate rugby union players in Japan
Toyota Industries Shuttles Aichi players
ACT Brumbies players
Australia international rugby union players